Albertinovac is a hamlet in Croatia, part of the village of Ledenik in Koška municipality. Until 1960s Albertinovac was an independent settlement, when it was merged with Ledenik.

Populated places in Osijek-Baranja County